La Cruz is a community located in Nuevo Laredo Municipality in the Mexican state of Tamaulipas. According to the INEGI Census of 2010, La Cruz has a population of 159 inhabitants.  Its elevation is 132 meters above sea level.

References 

Populated places in Tamaulipas
Laredo–Nuevo Laredo